Stylist can refer to:

Occupations 
 Automotive stylist or car stylist, a person involved in designing the appearance and ergonomics of automobiles
 Food stylist, a person who makes food look attractive in photographs
 Hair stylist, a person who cuts and styles hair
 Literary stylist, a master or critic of writing style
 Personal stylist, a person concerned with the style of a single individual
 Wardrobe stylist or fashion stylist, a person who chooses clothing and accessories

Other uses 
 Stylist (magazine), a British fashion magazine

See also
 Style (disambiguation)